Mike Smith is an English musician.

He gained experience as a studio musician, playing and touring with The Brand New Heavies. Smith is a member of the Gorillaz live band, being the only other constant live member since the band's debut, the other being co-founder and singer Damon Albarn. He is also an arranger of film scores including The Kid Who Would Be King and A Shaun the Sheep Movie: Farmageddon.

References

External links
 http://mikesmithmusic.co.uk/ official site

English composers
English rock keyboardists
British male saxophonists
English rock saxophonists
English music arrangers
Living people
Alumni of Leeds College of Music
21st-century saxophonists
21st-century British male musicians
Year of birth missing (living people)
Gorillaz members
Place of birth missing (living people)
The Brand New Heavies members